Mrittika Maya is a Bangladeshi film about the heartbreaking life of an old potter. The film's script, screenplay and direction was done by Gazi Rakayet and produced by Faridur Reza Sagar and Gazi Rakaet himself. The star casts of this film includes Lutfur Rahman George, Mamunur Rashid, Pijush Bandhopadhyay, Akhteruzzaman, Wahida Mollick Jolly, Mrinal Dutta and many more. The film was released for the mass audience on September 6.

Story
Khirmohon is an old man and a potter by profession. All his life, he has struggled to keep his head above water and now is the owner of his own pottery house and a banyan tree. His two sons Satten and Nikhil stay in the city and prefer urban life. They have no interest in their father's business and want to sell up his life's work for financial gain. The silver lining in Khirmohon's life is his granddaughter Poddo, who is an eye catching dusky beauty. They stay in the pottery house with another person named Boishakh, who was adopted by Khirmohon when he was just a mere child. Boishakh is a passionate character, who is loyal to Khirmohon and is more interested in keeping the pottery business afloat then Khirmohon's own sons. There is a spark between Poddo and Boishakh, but it is not expressed. The story moves forward with Boishakh trying to protect the business from going into ruins by unwanted invaders and village politics.

Cast
 Raisul Islam Asad - Khirmohon
 Titas Zia - Boishakh
 Shormi Mala - Poddo
 Aparna Ghosh
 Mamunur Rashid
 Piyush Bandhopaddhay
 Lutfur Rahman George
 Akhteruzzaman
 Wahida Mallik Jolly
 Mrinal Dutta 
 Ashiul Islam - Niren

Soundtrack
The soundtrack of the film composed by AK Azad.

Awards
Gazi Rakayet and Faridur Reza Sagor's 'Mrittika Maya' won awards in 17 categories including best director, best music director, best supporting actor, best actor in negative role, best story, best script writer and best art. It also stood second at SAARC Film Festival, held in Sri Lankan capital Colombo from May 26–31, winning a silver crest.

References

External links
 

2013 films
Bangladeshi romantic drama films
Bengali-language Bangladeshi films
2013 romantic drama films
2010s Bengali-language films
Best Film Bachsas Award winners
Best Film National Film Award (Bangladesh) winners
Films whose writer won the Best Screenplay National Film Award (Bangladesh)
Impress Telefilm films
Government of Bangladesh grants films